Brocchi's Cluster (also known as Collinder 399, Cr 399 or Al Sufi's Cluster) is a asterism of six stars in an apparent row, across 1.3° of the night sky and four others, in the south of the constellation Vulpecula, thus near Sagitta.  Its nickname is the Coathanger.  None of these ten stars are believed to be much gravitationally associated, so not a star cluster, a fact not known until 1997.  An additional 30 or so much fainter stars to terrestrial observers are sometimes considered to be associated.

History 
It was first described by the Persian astronomer Al Sufi in his Book of Fixed Stars in 964.

In the 17th century, it was independently rediscovered by the Italian astronomer G. B. Hodierna.

In the 1920s, Dalmero Francis Brocchi, an amateur astronomer and chart maker for the American Association of Variable Star Observers (AAVSO), created a map of the stars for use in calibrating photometers.

In 1931, Swedish astronomer Per Collinder listed it in his catalogue of open clusters.

Status 
The status of this group as a star cluster has changed in recent years. The group was considered to be a cluster for most of the 20th century. Looking at better, but imprecise metrics, a study in 1970 said that six of the brightest stars formed a cluster, the fainter four did not. Several independent studies since 1998 have determined that the stars are not a true cluster at all, but rather relatively near Milky Way stars on a close angular alignment. These recent studies are mostly rooted on improved measurements of parallax and proper motion from the Hipparcos satellite, picking up minute changes in angle as against other stars as it orbits the sun (with the Earth).  This data was first published in 1997 and has been enhanced by subsequent orbits and cross-referencing with other readings.

The "Coathanger" 

The asterism is made up of 10 stars ranging from 5th to 7th magnitude which form the conspicuous "coathanger", a straight line of 6 stars with a "hook" of 4 stars on the south side. An additional 30 or so much fainter stars to terrestrial observers are sometimes considered to be associated.

Under a dark sky, the coathanger can be seen with the naked eye as an unresolved patch of light; binoculars, zoom camera or a telescope at very low power are usually needed to view this asterism. It is best found by slowly sweeping across the Milky Way along an imaginary line from the bright star Altair toward the even brighter star Vega. About one third of the way, the Coathanger should be spotted easily against a darker region of the Milky Way. The asterism is best seen in July–August and north of 20° north latitude as compared to the closest horizon it will be upside-down (as in the picture top right of this page) when at its highest point. South of this latitude it is upright as the 'hanger' is south of the line of 6 stars.

The asterism and its immediate surroundings are a useful gauge for determining the faintest stars visible in a small telescope as there are a wide range of stellar magnitudes within the cluster easily viewed in one small patch of the sky.

There follows a table of the 10 stars commonly seen as members of the coathanger, organized by right ascension. They diverge in distance; HD 182955 and that suffixed -620 are, quite considerably, mutually the closest but certainly not gravitationally bound. The former has a proper motion on the second axis of −47.5 mas per year; the latter one of +9.8. This pair sit "across the hook" (i.e. widthways) as to their places in the asterism.

The faintest of the three bright stars, with resultant Flamsteed numbers, in this asterism is slightly dimmer than one without such a designation, and is joined by the six other stars in having a relatively similar Henry Draper catalog number, due to their position in the night sky and having sufficient apparent brightness (visible wavelength magnitude) to make the catalog.

NGC 6802
The "rail" of the coathanger leads, east, into an open star cluster of dozens of much more distant stars, likely mostly a true cluster (being gravitationally tied or associated).  Measurements put them initially at about 4,580 light years away however the same authors have refined their view and state they are a further 4,420 light years away, in a report which invokes Early Gaia Data Release 3, and 6th "internal" Gaia-ESO survey measurements.

References 

 Cragin, Murray; Lucyk, James; & Rappaport, Barry (1993). The Deep Sky Field Guide to Uranometria 2000.0 (1st ed). Richmond, VA: Willmann-Bell. 
 Dias, W.S.; Lépine, J.R.D.; & Alessi, B.S. (2001). "Proper motions of open clusters within 1 kpc based on the TYCHO2 Catalogue". Astronomy and Astrophysics 376, 441-447
 Hall, D.S. & VanLandingham, F.G. (1970). "The Nearby Poor Cluster Collinder 399". Pub. of the Astronomical Society of the Pacific  82 (487), p. 640-652
 Skiff, Brian (January, 1998). "Brocchi's Cluster Revealed". Sky and Telescope, p. 65-67

External links 
 Brocchi's Cluster, Collinder 399 - SEDS
 
 
  Collinder 399: The Coat Hanger - LRGB CCD image

Asterisms (astronomy)
Vulpecula
64
64